Cyprien Richard (born 27 January 1979) is a retired French World Cup alpine ski racer.

Born in Thonon-les-Bains, Haute Savoie, Richard attained four World Cup podiums, all in giant slalom, with one victory, at Adelboden, Switzerland, a tie with Aksel Lund Svindal for first place. He was also French national champion in giant slalom

World Cup

Season standings

Race podiums
 1 win – (1 GS)
 4 podiums – (4 GS)

World Championships

Olympics

References

External links 
 
 Cyprien Richard World Cup standings at the International Ski Federation
 
 
 
 
 

French male alpine skiers
Living people
1979 births
Alpine skiers at the 2010 Winter Olympics
Olympic alpine skiers of France
Alpine skiers at the 2014 Winter Olympics
People from Thonon-les-Bains
Sportspeople from Haute-Savoie
21st-century French people